This is a list of monuments in Lamjung District, Nepal as officially recognized by and available through the website of the Department of Archaeology, Nepal.
Lamjung is a district of Gandaki Province and is located in central Nepal.

List of monuments

|}

See also 
 List of monuments in Gandaki Province
 List of monuments in Nepal

References

External links

Lamjung